The Leghari (or Lighari, Laghari) is a Baloch clan of Rind tribe. The Leghari tribe mainly resides in Pakistan, followed by Iran. Descendants of the Laghari family mainly speak the languages of Balochi, and/or Saraiki, based on locality. Legharis living in Sindh mostly speak Sindhi-Saraiki, a combination of Sindhi and Saraiki, but they speak Sindhi too. Over two centuries, the Leghari tribe conquered a large part of what is today Dera Ghazi Khan District and established themselves at Choti Zareen (Lower Choti). The Leghari Tumandars (or Sardars i.e. Tribal leaders) ruled a vast territory and collected tax from as far off as Barkhan in Balochistan. The Leghari people dwell in all four provinces of Pakistan and other parts of the world as well. The Tribal Headquarter of Fort Munroo, which has a status of tribal Belt and is situated on the Koh Suleman mountain range.

The current Sardar of Leghari Tribe is Sardar Ghulam Mustafa Laghari. In addition, there are a large number of Leghari MNAs, Senators and MPAs in Punjab.

In Punjab, there are many Legharis scattered all over South and West Punjab right into DI Khan. Legharis have also served in senior government positions, including Ambassadors, Secretaries and Air Vice Marshal.

In Sindh, the Leghari's are mostly scattered all over the province, but most concentrated in Hyderabad, Dadu, Thatta, Sanghar and Larkana. Nawab Wali Mohammad Leghari served as the premier of Sindh during the Talpur Rule. Today among the most notables Legharis include Dr Javaid Laghari, who served as Senator and Chairman Higher Education Commission (HEC). He was also the founder of SZABIST, one of the best institution in Pakistan, and served as its first President. Sardar Nadir Leghari has also served as Minister of Irrigation. In addition, there are a number of MNAs and MPAs from Sindh, as well as a few provincial secretaries.

Leghari Tribe Membership in Assemblies 
Punjab Legislative Council 1921

Jamal Khan, Sardar, Leghari, (Tumandar, Dera Ghazi Khan, Baloch Tumandar)

Punjab Legislative Council 1923

Muhammad Jamal Khan, Khan Bahadur Sardar (Baloch Tumandar — Landholders)

Punjab Legislative Council 1927

Muhammad Jamal Khan Leghari, Khan Bahadur Nawab (Baloch Tumandars

Punjab Legislative Council 1930

Muhammad Jamal Khan Leghari, Khan Bahadur Nawab (Baluch Tumandars)

Punjab Legislative Assembly 1937

Khan Bahadur Nawab Sir Muhammad Jamal Khan Leghari (Tumandar) Minister Public Works

Punjab Legislative Assembly 1946

Muhammad Jamal Khan Leghari, Khan Bahadur Nawab Sir (Tumandar)

Punjab Legislative Assembly 1947

Muhammad Jamal Khan Leghari, Khan Bahadur Nawab Sir

“The first sitting was held on January 5, 1948. Sir Robert Francis Mudie, Governor of West Punjab appointed Mr Muhammad Jamal Khan Leghari to perform the duties of Speaker till new Speaker was elected.”

Punjab Legislative Assembly 1951

Muhammad Jamal Khan, K.B. Nawab Sardar (Dera Ghazi Khan-I)

First Sitting Presided by Sardar Jamal Muhammad Khan Leghari

Nawabzada Sardar Muhammad Khan Leghari, B.A. (Dera Ghazi Khan-II)

Minister Public Works, Buildings and Roads, Electricity and Transport, Irrigation, Revenue, Excise and Taxation, Resettlements and Colonies.

Provincial Assembly of West Pakistan 1956

Nawabzada Muhammad Khan Leghari, Sardar

National Assembly of Pakistan 1965

Mahmood Khan Leghari, Nawabzada Sardar

Provincial Assembly of the Punjab 1972

Atta Muhammad Khan Leghari, Nawabzada Sardar

Mahmood Khan Leghari, Nawabzada Sardar

Senate of Pakistan of 1973

Sardar Farooq Ahmed Khan Leghari

National Assembly of Pakistan 1977

Sardar Farooq Ahmed Khan Leghari, Minister Industries

Bilal Asghar Khan Leghari

Provincial Assembly of the Punjab 1977

Maqsood Ahmad Khan Leghari, Sardar

Provincial Council of The Punjab 1980

Rafique Haider Khan Leghari, Sardar Minister Food

Muhammad Omer Khan Leghari, Sardar

Provincial Council of The Punjab 1983

Rafique Haider Khan Leghari, Sardar Minister Food

Maqsood Ahmad Khan Leghari, Sardar

National Assembly of Pakistan 1985

Maqsood Ahmad Khan Leghari, Sardar. Minister Overseas Pakistanis

Provincial Assembly of the Punjab 1985

Muhammad Jaffar Khan Leghari, Sardar

Muhammad Omer Khan Leghari, Sardar

Rafique Haider Khan Leghari, Sardar

National Assembly of Pakistan 1988

Sardar Farooq Ahmed Khan Leghari. Minister Water and Power

Provincial Assembly of the Punjab 1988

Sardar Farooq Ahmad Khan Leghari (Leader of Opposition)

Muhammad Jaffar Khan Leghari, Sardar

Maqsood Ahmad Khan Leghari, Sardar

Muhammad Azhar Khan Leghari, Sardar

National Assembly of Pakistan 1990

Sardar Farooq Ahmed Khan Leghari

Provincial Assembly of the Punjab 1990

Maqsood Ahmad Khan Leghari, Sardar

Mansoor Ahmed Khan Leghari, Sardar

Muhammad Azhar Leghari, Sardar

National Assembly of Pakistan 1993

Sardar Farooq Ahmed Khan Leghari

Sardar Mansoor Ahmed Khan Leghari

Provincial Assembly of the Punjab 1993

Sardar Maqsood Ahmed Khan Leghari. Minister Irrigation

Muhammad Jaffar Khan Leghari, Sardar

Muhammad Azhar Leghari, Sardar

Rafiq Ahmad Khan Leghari, Sardar

National Assembly of Pakistan 1997

Sardar Muhammad Jaffar Khan Leghari

Senate of Pakistan of 1997

Sardar Mansoor Ahmed Khan Leghari

Provincial Assembly of the Punjab 1997

Maqsood Ahmed Khan Leghari, Sardar

Awais Ahmad Khan Leghari, Sardar

Rafiq Ahmed Khan Leghari, Sardar

Rafique Haider Leghari, Sardar

National Assembly of Pakistan 2002

Sardar Farooq Ahmed Khan Leghari

Sardar Muhammad Jaffar Khan Leghari

Mina Jaffar Leghari

Sardar Awais Ahmed Khan Leghari. Minister IT & Telecommunication

Provincial Assembly of the Punjab 2002

Sardar Muhammad Khan Leghari

Muhammad Mohsin Khan Leghari

Sardar Muhammad Yousaf Khan Leghari

Senate of Pakistan of 2006

Sardar Jamal Khan Leghari

National Assembly of Pakistan 2008

Sardar Farooq Ahmed Khan Leghari

Sardar Muhammad Jaffar Khan Leghari

Sardar Muhammad Arshad Khan Leghari

Sardar Awais Ahmed Khan Leghari

Provincial Assembly of the Punjab 2008

Sardar Muhammad Yousaf Khan Leghari

Muhammad Mohsin Khan Leghari

Sardar Muhammad Khan Leghari

Senate of Pakistan of 2012

Muhammad Mohsin Khan Leghari

National Assembly of Pakistan 2013

Sardar Muhammad Jaffar Khan Leghari

Sardar Muhammad Arshad Khan Leghari. MOS Industries & Production

Sardar Awais Ahmed Khan Leghari Minister Power

Provincial Assembly of the Punjab 2013

Sardar Muhammad Jamal Khan Leghari

Mahmood Qadir Khan Leghari

National Assembly of Pakistan 2018

Sardar Muhammad Jaffar Khan Leghari

Sardar Muhammad Khan Leghari

Provincial Assembly of the Punjab 2018

Muhammad Mohsin Khan Leghari Minister Irrigation

Sardar Awais Ahmed Khan Leghari

References 
 http://www.legharis.com/

Further reading

External links
History of Legharis https://tribune.com.pk/story/66746/leghari-tribe-crowns-its-27th-chief/
 Saraiki language#Dialects

Social groups of Balochistan, Pakistan
Baloch tribes